The Swissmakers is a Swiss 1978 comedy film directed by Rolf Lyssy. The movie deals with the many woes of foreigners who decide to obtain Swiss nationality but are forced to deal with bureaucratic and cultural barriers.

Die Schweizermacher was the highest-grossing Swiss film of all-time and remains one of the most successful Swiss movies, reaching 940,145 admissions in a country of 6.5 million inhabitants.

Cast
 Emil Steinberger – Moritz Fischer
 Walo Lüönd – Max Bodmer
 Beatrice Kessler – Milena Vakulic
 Claudio Caramaschi – Francesco Grimolli
 Wolfgang Stendar – Dr. Helmut Starke
 Hilde Ziegler – Gertrud Starke

References

External links

1978 films
Swiss comedy films
1978 comedy films
Films directed by Rolf Lyssy
1970s German-language films
Swiss German-language films
Films about immigration